A research group led by Raphael Mechoulam at Hebrew University has synthesized many cannabinoids. Some of those are:

 HU-210 — a high affinity CB1 agonist (Ki = 0.23 nM)
 HU-211 — the (+)-enantiomer of HU-210 with dramatically reduced CB1 affinity
 HU-239 — also known as ajulemic acid
 HU-243
 HU-308
 HU-320
 HU-331
 HU-336
 HU-345

See also
 List of AM cannabinoids
 List of CP cannabinoids
 List of JWH cannabinoids
 List of miscellaneous designer cannabinoids

References

HU
Cannabis-related lists